Tsurai (also, Tschura, Tschura-Allequas, Tsurau, and Zoreisch) is a former Yurok settlement in Humboldt County, California. It was located at Trinidad, at an elevation of 174 feet (53 m) and is California State Historic Landmark #838.

References

Former settlements in Humboldt County, California
Former Native American populated places in California
Yurok villages
California Historical Landmarks